The Amur whitefish (Coregonus ussuriensis) is a species of freshwater whitefish. It can withstand significant salinity levels. Its life expectancy is 10 to 11 years. The Amur whitefish is usually eaten salted or smoked.

Distribution
Its distribution includes the middle reaches of the Amur, downstream of Blagoveshchensk, all along the lower reaches and including its estuary. It lives as well in the Kukhtuy river, the Tatar Strait and the southern part of the Sea of Okhotsk. It also has been recorded in Sakhalin, in the lagoons of the northwestern and northeastern coasts, as well as in the Ainskoe and Sladkoe coastal lakes. It is also found in the Zeya and Sungari rivers, and in the Ussuri River and Lake Khanka.

See also
List of freshwater fish of Russia

References 

ussuriensis
Fish described in 1906
Taxa named by Johann Friedrich Gmelin
Freshwater fish of the Arctic
Taxonomy articles created by Polbot
Taxobox binomials not recognized by IUCN